Collectin-12, also known as collectin subfamily member 12, is a collectin protein that in humans is encoded by the COLEC12 gene.

Function

This gene encodes a member of the collectin family, proteins that possess collagen-like sequences and carbohydrate recognition domains. This protein is a scavenger receptor that displays several functions associated with host defense. It can bind to carbohydrate antigens on microorganisms, facilitating their recognition and removal. It also mediates the recognition, internalization, and degradation of oxidatively modified low density lipoprotein by vascular endothelial cells. [provided by RefSeq, May 2018].

References

Further reading